The CPU core voltage (VCORE) is the power supply voltage supplied to the CPU (which is a digital circuit), GPU, or other device containing a processing core.  The amount of power a CPU uses, and thus the amount of heat it dissipates, is the product of this voltage and the current it draws.
In modern CPUs, which are CMOS circuits, the current is almost proportional to the clock speed, the CPU drawing almost no current between clock cycles.  (See, however, subthreshold leakage.)

Power saving and clock speed 

To conserve power and manage heat, many laptop and desktop processors have a power management feature that software (usually the operating system) can use to adjust the clock speed and core voltage dynamically.

Often a voltage regulator module converts from 5V or 12 V or some other voltage to whatever CPU core voltage is required by the CPU.

The trend is towards lower core voltages, which conserve power.  This presents the CMOS designer with a challenge, because in CMOS the voltages go only to ground and the supply voltage, the source, gate, and drain terminals of the FETs have only the supply voltage or zero voltage across them.

The MOSFET formula:  says that the current  supplied by the FET is proportional to the gate-source voltage reduced by a threshold voltage , which depends on the geometrical shape of the FET's channel and gate and their physical properties, especially capacitance. To reduce  (necessary to reduce supply voltage and increase current) one must increase capacitance. However, the load being driven is another FET gate, so the current it requires is proportional to capacitance, which thus requires the designer to keep capacitance low. 

The trend towards lower supply voltage therefore works against the goal of high clock speed.
Only improvements in photolithography and reduction in threshold voltage allow both to improve at once. On another note, the formula shown above is for long channel MOSFETs. With the area of the MOSFETs halving every 18-24 months (Moore's law) the distance between the two terminals of the MOSFET switch called the channel length is becoming smaller and smaller. This changes the nature of the relationship between terminal voltages and current. 

Overclocking a processor increases its clock speed at the cost of system stability. Withstanding higher clock speeds often requires higher core voltage at the cost of power consumption and heat dissipation. This is called "overvolting". Overvolting generally involves running a processor out of its specifications, which may damage it or shorten CPU life.

Dual-voltage CPU
A dual-voltage CPU uses a split-rail design so the processor core can use a lower voltage, while the external Input/Output (I/O) voltages remain at 3.3 volts for backwards compatibility.

A single-voltage CPU uses a single power voltage throughout the chip, supplying both I/O power and internal power.
As of 2002 Microprocessor#Market statistics, most CPUs are single-voltage CPUs.
All CPUs before the Pentium MMX are single-voltage CPUs.

Dual-voltage CPUs were introduced for performance gain when increasing clock speeds and finer semiconductor fabrication processes caused excess heat generation and power supply concerns, especially regarding laptop computers. Using a voltage regulator, the external I/O voltage levels was transformed to lower voltages to reduce power draw, resulting in less heat for the ability to operate at higher frequencies.

VRT is a feature on older Intel P5 Pentium processors that are typically intended for use in a mobile environment.  It refers to splitting the core voltage supply from the I/O voltage.  A VRT processor has a 3.3 V I/O and 2.9 V core voltage, to save power compared to a typical Pentium processor with both I/O and core voltage at 3.3V.  All Pentium MMX and later processors adopted this so-called split rail power supply.

See also 
 Dynamic voltage scaling
 Switched-mode power supply applications (SMPS)

References

External links
 Hardwareanalysis.com's article about how to increase voltage to help overclocking
An Illustrated Guide to Pentiums (Karbos Guide)
Processor Voltage >> PC Mechanic

Central processing unit
X86 architecture